6RTR may refer to:

The 6th Royal Tank Regiment of the British Army
6RTR, a radio station in Perth, Western Australia